Piazza Tasso is a city square in Oltrarno, Florence, Italy.

Buildings around the square
Walls of Florence
Church and convent of San Salvatore a Camaldoli

Tasso